Minsa'y Isang Gamu-gamo (English: Once a Moth) is a 1976 Filipino protest drama film directed by Lupita Aquino-Kashiwahara with a story and screenplay by Marina Feleo-Gonzales. It stars Nora Aunor, Jay Ilagan, Gloria Sevilla, and Perla Bautista. Set near Clark Air Base in Pampanga, the film depicts the lives of two families affected by the American military presence in the Philippines.

Premiering at the 2nd Metro Manila Film Festival, the film won Best Story for Feleo-Gonzales. In 2018, the film was digitally restored by the ABS-CBN Film Restoration Project with a subsequent theatrical premier at the Cinema One Originals festival of that year.

It was the first important film to address the subject of the American military presence in the Philippines during the Bases era. The film ultimately argues for the closure of these facilities.

Plot
Set in 1969, the film tells the intertwined stories of a couple and their families, both of a lower-middle-class background, living near Clark Air Base in Pampanga.

Corazon de la Cruz (Nora Aunor) is a nurse who plans to go to the United States as a trainee. She hopes to one day get a green card that would allow her to stay in the United States, gain immigrant status, and eventually bring her family there so they can lead a better life. Corazon's mother, Chedeng (Gloria Sevilla), and younger brother, Carlito (Eddie Villamayor), encourage her. However, her grandfather, Inkong Menciong (Paquito Salcedo) is critical of her plans, saying that it is a betrayal of their country.

Meanwhile, Bonifacio Santos (Jay Ilagan) intends to join the United States Navy so that he can follow his girlfriend, Corazon, to the United States. His mother, Yolando (Perla Bautista), a worker in the American Base commissary, attempts to help however she can.

The young couple's dreams begin to break down after Yolando is wrongfully accused of theft, strip-searched, and humiliated by a Filipino merchandise officer working at the Base. Bonifacio convinces his mother to file charges of "slander by deed" against the officer, and their lawyer files a letter of protest against the American base commander. In response, the merchandise officer, accompanied by two American service personnel, raid Yolanda's store and confiscate all of her merchandise. The goods are eventually returned, but a case against the Base personnel for conducting the illegal raid cannot prosper due to a lack of jurisdiction. A disillusioned Bonifacio no longer wishes to join the American navy.

On the night of Corazon's farewell party, her brother is attempts to fly a red, blue, and white kite near the Base. Carlito is shot dead by a serviceman. A group of American officers attend the funeral and offer a donation to the de la Cruz family, adding that the serviceman had thought Carlito was merely a wild boar. An outraged Corazon yells back at them, "Ang kapatid ko ay hindi baboy! (My brother is not a pig!)" During the funeral procession, Inkong's memory of World War II is triggered and the film cuts to historical footage of the Bataan Death March.

The de la Cruz family file a criminal case against the American serviceman. During the hearing, the lawyer representing the American base notifies the court that there is lack of jurisdiction as Corporal John S. Smith returned to the United States upon the termination of his tour of duty. The judge dismisses the case. Walking down the steps of the courthouse, the base lawyer attempts to give Corazon an envelope filled with dollars from Corporal Smith, again saying that the serviceman thought her brother was a wild boar. Corazon shows the lawyer a photo of her brother and pushes the envelope back to him.

There is a motorcycle accident outside the courthouse. Corazon's lawyer pushes through the crowd exclaiming that there is a nurse. The motorcycle driver's helmet is removed and it is revealed to be a white man. The film closes with a shot of Corazon looking down at the accident victim.

Cast

Production

Development 

Story and screenplay writer Marina Feleo-Gonzales became interested in the political topic in 1971 after seeing a student protest in Rizal Park. The students were running from police who were breaking up the protest, some student protestors asking Feleo-Gonzales to pretend to be their mother as a form of protection from the police. Producer Digna Santiago and director Lupita Aquino-Kashiwahara were interested in working together on a political film addressing the American military presence in the Philippines. Feleo-Gonzales had previously worked with Aquino-Kashiwahara on the 1975 historical drama Lakambini at Supremo, about Andres Bonifacio and his wife Gregoria de Jesus, which was produced by Armida Siguion-Reyna.

The shooting of Corazon de la Cruz's younger brother Carlito was inspired by the 1964 shooting near Clark Air Base of Filipino teenager Rogelio Balagtas by off-duty American sentry Larry Cole. The father of Balagtas was given $787 as death compensation.

Casting 
Nora Aunor suggested her real-life brother, Eddie Villamayor, for the role of her on-screen brother. Both producer Digna Santiago and director Lupita Aquino-Kashiwahara agreed, the latter saying the casting "gave authenticity to the searing scenes of grief, pain and loss." Aquino-Kashiwara previously directed Villamayor in the 1975 film Alkitrang Dugo, a Filipino adaptation of William Golding's novel Lord of the Flies.

Filming 
The film was shot in Pampanga over 17 days.

Themes and allusions

The film has been described by film historian Jose Capino as belonging to the "cinema of decolonization" along with Lino Brocka's PX and Augusto Buenaventura's Sa Kuko ng Agila, all explicitly addressing the issue of the American military presence in the Philippines during the Bases era, as the 1970s saw growing political and legal debates over Philippine sovereignty and the American bases. In the film, Philippine sovereignty is both literally and metaphorically compromised.

In particular, towards the end of the film, Corazon de la Cruz struggles to perform the traditional tinikling dance during her farewell party, and the scene is juxtaposed with her brother flying a red, blue, and white kite (the colors of both the American and the Philippine flag) over Crow Valley near Clark Air Base. At the point where Corazon errs in the tinikling, her leg caught between the bamboo poles, the film cuts to Carlito falling after being shot by an American officer. According to Capino, the film "marks the impossibility–at least during its historical moment–of parity between ex-colonizer and ex-colonized." It is notable that Carlito dies when his family are busy celebrating Corazon's departure for the United States, so the "juxtaposition of the tinikling and kite scenes forms a rather pedantic image of cultural conflict." After Carlito's death, Inkong Menciong burns the kite, recalling the laws against flag burning during the American colonial period.

There is a parallelism between Carlito and the spit-roasted pig served at the farewell party of Corazon, foreshadowed in the film when Carlito and Inkong watch the pig's slaughter before the party. The defense given by the American personnel is that the shooter mistook Carlito for a wild boar. In response, Corazon asserts the film's famous line: "Ang kapatid ko ay hindi baboy! (My brother is not a pig!)"

The film makes several historical allusions, including: Inkong's memory of the Bataan Death March; the Vietnam War, with Clark Air Base used as a refueling station; and the 1969 moon landing, with Inkong asking, "Corazon, do they [the Americans] also own the moon now?"

Release 
The film premiered on December 25, 1976, as one of the entries for the 2nd Metro Manila Film Festival.

Restoration 
In 2018, the film was digitally restored and remastered by the ABS-CBN Film Restoration Project. The restoration was done at the Kantana Film Institute. On the film restoration, director Lupita Aquino-Kashiwahara said: 

The restored version premiered on October 16, 2018, at Cinema Centenario in Quezon City as part of the Cinema One Originals festival.

Reception
The film received mixed reviews. Nicanor Tiongson, writing for The Philippine Daily Express, praised Nora Aunor's performance, and concluded stating "flaws notwithstanding, the film stands as one of the best in 1976 Filipino Film Festival and in the year 1976 as well not only because the story and screenplay, and most of all, the point of view of the movie are unequivocally and passionately Filipino."

Government reaction 
After the film was released, the U.S. Embassy in Manila requested a copy from Premiere Productions. In 1980, when traveling to the United States, story and screenplay writer Marina Feleo-Gonzales was interrogated by immigration officers over the film.

Accolades

Adaptations
In 1991, the Philippine Educational Theater Association (PETA) staged an adaptation of the film. The stage play also starred Nora Aunor, reprising her role, in her first appearance on stage. The adaptation was written by Rodolfo Vera and directed by Soxy Tapacio. It premiered at the Raha Sulayman Theater in Fort Santiago. The source material was chosen as that year Philippine senators moved to vote against renewing the Military Bases Agreement, effectively removing the presence of the United States military in the country for the time being.

Notes

References

Works cited

External links
 
 

Filipino-language films
Philippine drama films
1976 films
1976 drama films